"If This Isn't Love" is a popular 1946 song composed by Burton Lane with lyrics written by E. Y. Harburg. The song was published in 1946 and introduced by Ella Logan and Donald Richards the following year in the Broadway musical Finian's Rainbow.

Recorded versions
Buddy Clark (recorded on November 12, 1946, released on Columbia 37223).
Ella Logan, Donald Richards and the Lynn Murray Singers (recorded on April 7, 1947)
The Clayton Brothers - included in their album Siblingity (2000).
Alma Cogan - a single release in 1958.
Michael Feinstein - included in his album Romance on Film, Romance on Broadway (2000)
Gracie Fields (recorded on September 1, 1947).
Don Francks, Petula Clark, Fred Astaire (1968 Film Soundtrack)
Geraldo & his Orchestra (vocal: Denny Vaughan) (1948).
Stan Kenton - for his album Finian's Rainbow (1968).
Dean Martin - for the album Finian's Rainbow (1963)
Karen Mason - for her album Not So Simply Broadway (1995).
Biff McGuire, Jeannie Carson, Bobby Howes (1960 Broadway Revival)
Frank Sinatra (1955) recorded for the abandoned animated film version of Finian's Rainbow, released on Frank Sinatra in Hollywood 1940-1964 (2002)
 Melissa Errico, Max von Essen and Jonathan Freeman in the Footlights recording of the Irish Repertory Theatre production of the show (2004).
Sarah Vaughan - for her album Sarah Vaughan Sings Broadway: Great Songs from Hit Shows (1958)

References

Songs from musicals
Songs with lyrics by Yip Harburg
1946 songs
Songs with music by Burton Lane